Navod is a Sinhalese masculine given name that may refer to the following notable Sri Lankan cricketers:

Navod Ilukwatta (born 1991)
Navod Madushanka Weeratunga (born 1996)
Navod Paranavithana (born 2002)

Sinhalese masculine given names